The Kingston Canadians were a junior ice hockey team in the Ontario Hockey League from 1973 to 1988. The team played home games at the Kingston Memorial Centre in Kingston, Ontario, Canada.

History
The Kingston Canadians arrival in the Ontario Hockey Association (OHA) for the 1973–74 OHL season, was a result of the Montreal Junior Canadiens switch to the Quebec Major Junior Hockey League (QMJHL) in 1972. During the summer of 1972, the QMJHL had threatened a lawsuit against the OHA to force the Junior Canadiens to return to the Quebec-based league. To solve the problem, the OHA granted the Junior Canadiens franchise a "one-year suspension" of operations, while team ownership transferred the team and players into the QMJHL, renaming themselves the Montreal Bleu Blanc Rouge in the process.

The OHA then reactivated the suspended franchise after a one-year hiatus, under new ownership and with new players, calling the team the Kingston Canadians. A group of Kingston business and professionals negotiated the purchase from the Montreal Arena Corporation. The new ownership, the Kingston Frontenacs Hockey Ltd. was made up of a combination of the owners of two local organizations, the local OHA Junior 'A' Franchise owners, James W. Magee, George 'Doc' Myles, Dr. William. A. Osborne, and Dr. Wilmer J. Nuttall and a local Minor Hockey Organization operated by Dr. Gerry Wagar, Dr. Michael Simurda, J.Douglas Cunningham Q.C., Peter J. Radley Q.C., Ken Linseman, Hugh Bennett, and Terry French who withdrew from the group shortly after the purchase was completed. The new Kingston team was essentially an expansion franchise promoted from the OHA's Tier II league, that had only common name to share with the old Junior Canadiens. However, in some OHA histories (such as the annual Media Guide) the Kingston team is still shown as the legitimate successors of the Junior Canadiens' legacy.

The Kingston Canadians used the same colours and uniforms as the NHL's Montreal Canadiens and Junior Canadiens. The Kingston logo replaced the "H" with the letter "K" for Kingston. Some sources show the name as "Kingston Canadiens", but the English "Canadians" is correct.

The team played from 1973 to 1980 in the OHA, then from 1980 to 1988 in the OHL. The Kingston Canadians franchise was sold following the 1987–88 season, and the new owner renamed the team Kingston Raiders.  The following season they were again sold and renamed Kingston Frontenacs.

Notable Events
In 1981 Kingston hosted the annual OHL All-Star game. The Emms division coached by Paul Gauthier beat the Leyden division coached by Terry Crisp 4 to 3.
In 1985–1986 season, Chris Clifford was the OHL first goalie to score a goal.
A 28-game losing streak in 1987–1988, the final season of the Canadians.
A pre-game brawl during the warm-ups of a game featuring the Kingston Canadians & Belleville Bulls in Belleville during the 1985-86 OHL hockey season was the reason why the two linesmen who are scheduled to work as on ice officials for a game are on the ice during the two teams' warm-ups prior to an OHL hockey game because that pre-game warm-up brawl in Belleville went on without any officials on the ice to attempt to restore order.  Ever since that pre-game warm-ups brawl between the Kingston Canadians & Belleville Bulls in Belleville during the 1985-86 OHL season the two linemen stand at centre ice as a deterrent of a player getting into a fight & to try to prevent the two teams from getting involved in a pre-game brawl.

The Kingston Canadians are now a minor rep hockey team that represents the KAMHA league in Kingston Ontario and they are named after the old OHL team.

Coaches
Jim Morrison coached the Canadians for almost half the team's tenure in the OHA & OHL. He was an NHL veteran defenceman of 704 games, as well as being a player coach with the AHL Baltimore Clippers.

Four other Canadians coaches also played in the NHL. They are, Jack Bownass, Rod Graham, Fred O'Donnell & Jim Dorey.

Jack Bownass was the recipient of the Matt Leyden Trophy as OHA Coach of the Year in 1973-1974.

List of Coaches
(Multiple years in parentheses)

1973–1975 Jack Bownass (2)
1975–1982 Jim Morrison (7)
1982–1983 Rod Graham
1983–1985 Rick Cornacchia (2)
1985–1985 Jim Dorey (2)
1985–1987 Fred O'Donnell (2)
1987–1988 Jacques Tremblay
1988–1988 Jim Dorey (2)

Players

Award winners

Eddie Powers Memorial TrophyScoring Champion.
1983–84 Tim Salmon

Max Kaminsky TrophyMost Outstanding Defenceman.
1974–75 Mike O'Connell

Jack Ferguson AwardFirst overall draft pick.
1985 Bryan Fogarty

William Hanley TrophyMost Sportsmanlike OHL Player.
1983–84 Kevin Conway

Bobby Smith TrophyScholastic player of the year.
1985–86 Chris Clifford

Retired numbers
NONE. Five numbers have been "honoured" from the Kingston Canadians, although not retired and still in circulation. (#5 Mike O'Connell, #7 Tony McKegney, #10 Brad Rhiness, #14 Ken Linseman and #29 Chris Clifford).

NHL alumni
In 2004 Paul Coffey became the only Kingston Canadian inducted into the Hockey Hall of Fame to date. In 1977-1978 Paul was a late season addition from the North York Rangers. He played 8 regular reason games with the Canadians, and 5 playoffs games the same season.

Source

Season-by-season results

Regular season

Playoffs
1973–1974 Out of playoffs.
1974–1975 Lost to Toronto Marlboros in quarter-finals 9 points to 7.
1975–1976 Lost to Ottawa 67's in quarter-finals 9 points to 5.
1976–1977 Defeated Sudbury Wolves in quarter-finals 9 points to 3. Lost to Ottawa 67's in semi-finals 9 points to 7.
1977–1978 Lost to S.S.Marie Greyhounds in first round 6 points to 4.
1978–1979 Defeated Ottawa 67's in first round 6 points to 2. Lost to Peterborough Petes in quarter-finals 9 points to 5.
1979–1980 Lost to Sudbury Wolves in first round 3 games to 0.
1980–1981 Defeated Ottawa 67's in division semi-finals 9 points to 5. Lost to S.S. Marie Greyhounds in division finals 9 points to 5.
1981–1982 Lost to Peterborough Petes in first round 6 points to 2.
1982–1983 Out of playoffs.
1983–1984 Out of playoffs.
1984–1985 Out of playoffs.
1985–1986 Defeated Oshawa Generals in first round 8 points to 4. Finished 3rd place in round-robin versus Peterborough Petes and Belleville Bulls, and are eliminated.
1986–1987 Defeated Belleville Bulls in first round 4 games to 2. Lost to Oshawa Generals in quarter-finals 4 games to 2.
1987–1988 Out of playoffs.

Kingston Memorial Centre
The home arena of the Canadians was the Kingston Memorial Centre with a seating capacity 3,079 seated, and 3,300 including standing room.
Kingston Memorial Centre The OHL Arena & Travel Guide

References

Defunct Ontario Hockey League teams
Sport in Kingston, Ontario
1973 establishments in Ontario
1988 disestablishments in Ontario
Ice hockey clubs established in 1973
Ice hockey clubs disestablished in 1988